Tetraschalis mikado is a moth of the family Pterophoridae. It is known from the islands of Honshu and Kyushu in Japan.

The length of the forewings is 11–13 mm.

External links
Taxonomic and Biological Studies of Pterophoridae of Japan (Lepidoptera)
Japanese Moths

Pterophorinae
Moths of Japan
Moths described in 1933